Brumm is a surname. Notable people with the surname include:

Charles N. Brumm (1838-1917), American politician
Don Brumm (born 1941), American football player
Fred Brumm (1877-1936), American football player
George F. Brumm (1880-1934), American politician
Leonard Brumm (1926-2006), American ice hockey player
Roman Brumm (1898-1981), American football player